is a Japanese politician of the Constitutional Democratic Party of Japan, a member of House of Representatives in the Diet (national legislature). Yamahana served as Parliamentary Secretary for Foreign Affairs in the cabinet of Naoto Kan and as Deputy Justice Minister in the cabinet of Yoshihiko Noda.

Yamahana is the son of the former chairman of the Japanese Socialist Party, Sadao Yamahana. He started his political career as a secretary to then-Diet member and future Prime Minister Yukio Hatoyama.

Yamahana has only run in Tokyo's 22nd district for all his parliamentary career and represented it several times. He lost his seat twice in the LDP landslides of 2005 and 2012. After 2 unsuccessful runs to regain his seat in 2012 and 2014, Yamahana managed to return to the Diet in the 2017 election via the Tokyo proportional representation block. While losing the race for the Tokyo-22nd seat, he gained enough votes to be returned through the CDP's list in the Tokyo block.

See also 
 Tokyo Shimbun

References

External links 
Official website

Members of the House of Representatives (Japan)
Ritsumeikan University alumni
Living people
1967 births
Constitutional Democratic Party of Japan politicians
Democratic Party of Japan politicians
Social Democratic Party (Japan) politicians
Japanese social democrats
21st-century Japanese politicians